A Coruña is one of the 59 constituencies represented in the Senate, the upper chamber of the Spanish parliament, the Cortes Generales. The constituency elects four senators. Its boundaries correspond to those of the Spanish province of A Coruña. The electoral system uses an open list partial block voting, with electors voting for individual candidates instead of parties. Electors can vote for up to three candidates.

Senators

Elections

November 2019 general election

April 2019 general election

2016 general election

2015 general election

2011 general election

2008 general election

2004 general election

2000 general election

1996 general election

1993 general election

1989 general election

1986 general election

1982 general election

1979 general election

1977 general election

References

Senate constituencies in Spain
1977 establishments in Spain
Constituencies established in 1977
Province of A Coruña
Politics of Galicia (Spain)